Fabrizio Rongione (born 3 March 1973) is a Belgian screenwriter, film producer and actor.

Career 
Rongione was born in Brussels, Belgium of Italian descent. He collaborated with Jean-Pierre and Luc Dardenne in Rosetta (1999), L’Enfant (2005), Lorna's Silence (2008), The Kid with a Bike (2011), Two Days, One Night (2014) and The Unknown Girl (2016). In 2002 he founded the film production company Eklektik Productions with Nicolas de Borman, Samuel Tilman and Stéphane Heymans.

Rongione hosted the Magritte Awards ceremony for two consecutive years in 2013 and 2014, and again in 2018.

Selected filmography

Film

Television

Theatre

Actor 
1997 : Vous permettez, Hugo ? by Tadeusz Różewicz, dir. Olivier Musenfarth - Brussels
1997 : Le Piège by Tadeusz Różewicz, dir. Serenella Morelli : Franz Kafka
1998 : Bent by Martin Sherman, dir. Derek Goldby - Brussels, Paris
1999: Ferdydurke by Witold Gombrowicz, dir. Elvire Brison : Mientus - Brussels
1999 : The Red and the Black by Stendhal, adaptation by Jacques De Decker, dir. Michel Wright : Julien Sorel - Brussels
1999 : Egmont by Goethe, dir. Jean-Claude Idée - Brussels
2000 : Foudres, dir. Véronique Van Meerbeeck
2001 : The Open Couple by Dario Fo, dir. Daniela Bisconti - Brussels
2002-2003 : C'était Bonaparte, dir. Robert Hossein : Napoleon - Paris
2005 : La Princesse de Babylone, dir. José Besprosvany - Schaerbeek
2005 : Papiers d’Arménie, dir. Caroline Safarian - Brussels
2005-2007 : The Game of Love and Chance by Marivaux, dir. Dominique Serron - Brussels
2007 : One for the Road by Harold Pinter, dir. Marcel Gonzalez and Vincent Bruno - Brussels
2007 : Une rencontre by  Fabrice Gardin, dir. Claude Henuset - Brussels
2008 : L'assassin habite au 21, dir. Claude Henuset, from Stanislas-André Steeman : Ginger Lawson - Brussels
2013 : Le Cid by Pierre Corneille, dir. Dominique Serron : Rodrigue

Actor, author and director 
1998 : Les Fléaux, cowritten and co dir. with Samuel Tilman - Brussels, Paris
2001 : John and the wonderful’s, collective writing, co dir. with Samuel Tilman - Brussels
2002-2003 : À genoux, one man show, cowritten with Samuel Tilman, Samuel Tilman and Marcel Gonzalez - Brussels, Festival d’Avignon
2009 : On vit peu mais on meurt longtemps, one man show, cowritten and co dir. with Samuel Tilman - Brussels, tour Belgium and France

Awards 
 1998 : Grand Prix and Prix du public at Festival du rire, Brussels for Les Fléaux
 2002 : Prix du Théâtre for best one man show for A genoux

References

External links

 
Official website 

1973 births
20th-century Belgian male actors
21st-century Belgian male actors
Belgian male film actors
Belgian male stage actors
Belgian male television actors
Belgian screenwriters
Belgian film producers
Living people
Belgian people of Italian descent
Mass media people from Brussels
Cours Florent alumni
Magritte Award winners
Male actors from Brussels